is a Japanese writer of crime fiction, hardboiled, thriller, spy fiction and western fiction. He served as the 11th President of the Mystery Writers of Japan from 2001 to 2005. Outside of his literary works, he is also known for his interest in Flamenco music. He is a competent guitarist in his own right and has several guitars around his office.

Works in English translation
Thriller Novel
 The Red Star of Cádiz (original title: Kadisu no Akai Hoshi), trans. Usha Jayaraman (Kurodahan Press, 2008)

Essay
 My Favourite Mystery, "The Hollow Needle" by Maurice Leblanc (Mystery Writers of Japan, Inc. )

Awards
 1980 – All Yomimono Prize for New Mystery Writers: Ansatsusha Guranada ni Shisu (The Assassin is Dead in Granada) (Short story)
 1986 – Japan Adventure Fiction Association Prize: The Red Star of Cádiz
 1987 – Mystery Writers of Japan Award for Best Novel: The Red Star of Cádiz
 1987 – Naoki Prize: The Red Star of Cádiz
 2013 – Japan Mystery Literature Award for Lifetime Achievement

Main works

Shrike the Killer series
 , 1986
 , 1988
 , 1992
 , 1996
 , 2002

Private detective Shinsaku Okasaka series
Novels
 , 1989
 , 1997
 , 2000
 , 2004
 , 2013
Short story collections
 , 1987
 , 1992
 , 1998

Detective Vulture series
 , 2000
 , 2002
 , 2003
 , 2006
 , 2010

Iberian Peninsula series
Espionage novels set in Iberian Peninsula during World War II.
 , 1999
 , 2001
 , 2003
 , 2005
 , 2008
 , 2010

Standalone thriller novels
 , 1981
 , 1984
 , 1986 (The Red Star of Cádiz, Kurodahan Press, 2008)
 , 1988
 , 1991 (Shadow of a Distant Land)
 , 1993
 , 1998
 , 1999

Western novels
 , 2002
 , 2005

See also

Japanese detective fiction

References

External links
 Profile at J'Lit Books from Japan 
 Synopsis of Shadow of a Distant Land (Shaei harukana kuni) at JLPP (Japanese Literature Publishing Project) 
 Review of The Red Star of Cádiz at Crime Fiction Lover 

1943 births
20th-century Japanese novelists
21st-century Japanese novelists
Japanese male short story writers
Japanese crime fiction writers
Spy fiction writers
Western (genre) writers
Mystery Writers of Japan Award winners
Living people
Writers from Tokyo
20th-century Japanese short story writers
21st-century Japanese short story writers
20th-century Japanese male writers
21st-century male writers